Świtezianka, until 1945, known as Martin Lake (German: Martin See) was a small lake in the city of Szczecin, Poland, located in the Arkonian Forest Park. It was formed in the swamp near the Osówka stream. The lake had the length of 220 m, and width of 100 m. Since the beginning of the 20th century, the lake had been popular bathing lake, until it dried out. In its place, had been built the Arkonka swimming pool complex.

References 

Switezianka
Switezianka